2022 ASEAN University Games officially the 20th ASEAN University Games and also known as Ubon Ratchathani 2022 is a regional multi-sport event held from 26 July to 6 August 2022 in Ubon Ratchathani, Thailand. Originally planned to take place from 13 to 22 December 2020, it was eventually rescheduled as a result of the COVID-19 pandemic.

Preparation and development

Venues

The 20th ASEAN University Games has 13 venues for the games.

The Games

Sports
There were 23 sports for these games.

Participating nations
All 11 members of Southeast Asian Games Federation took part in the 2022 Asean University Games. Below is a list of all the participating NOCs.

While Thailand and Indonesia were initially barred from using their national flags due to sanctions by the World Anti-Doping Agency, the sanction was lifted on 3 February 2022.

 
 
 
 
 
 
 
 
  (Host)

Calendar
Source:

Medal table
Source:

References

External links
 Website

ASEAN University Games
Multi-sport events in Thailand
ASEAN University Games
International sports competitions hosted by Thailand
2022 in Asian sport
ASEAN
ASEAN
ASEAN